Raef Ftouni is a Lebanese weightlifter. He competed in the men's heavyweight I event at the 1980 Summer Olympics.

References

Year of birth missing (living people)
Living people
Lebanese male weightlifters
Olympic weightlifters of Lebanon
Weightlifters at the 1980 Summer Olympics
Place of birth missing (living people)
Asian Games medalists in weightlifting
Weightlifters at the 1978 Asian Games
Asian Games silver medalists for Lebanon
Medalists at the 1978 Asian Games
20th-century Lebanese people